Lucie is a feminine given name and also a family name.

Lucie may also refer to:

 Lucie (band), a Czech rock band
 Lucie (1963 film), a Czechoslovak film
 Lucie (1979 film), a Norwegian drama film
 Lucie, Suriname
 Lucie Miller, a fictional character inDoctor Who
 Lucie River, a river in Suriname

See also
 Lucy (disambiguation)
 Luce (disambiguation)
 Luci (disambiguation)
 Luciana (disambiguation)
 Lucifer (disambiguation)
 St. Lucie (disambiguation)